Ning Weichen (born 18 March 1996) is a Chinese footballer who currently plays for China League Two club Zhuhai Qin'ao.

Club career
Ning Weichen moved to Portugal in 2014 and received training with Mafra and Loures youth academy. He made his senior debut on for Loures in the last of match of the season against Atlético da Malveira on 15 May 2016. Ning transferred to Cova da Piedade, which newly earned promotion to LigaPro, on 6 August 2016. On 27 November 2016, he made his debut for the club in a 2–1 home defeat against Famalicão, coming on as a substitute for Danielson in the 80th minute. Ning was loaned to Campeonato de Portugal side Tourizense in February 2017.

On 14 July 2017, Ning transferred to Chinese Super League club Beijing Sinobo Guoan. He made his debut for the club on 29 October 2017 in a 1–0 away loss against Jiangsu Suning, coming on for Jin Taiyan in the 87th minute.

Career statistics 
Statistics accurate as of match played 31 December 2020.

References

External links
 

1997 births
Living people
Chinese footballers
Footballers from Shenyang
GS Loures players
C.D. Cova da Piedade players
G.D. Tourizense players
Beijing Guoan F.C. players
Chinese Super League players
China League Two players
Liga Portugal 2 players
Segunda Divisão players
Association football forwards
Chinese expatriate footballers
Expatriate footballers in Portugal
Chinese expatriate sportspeople in Portugal